Tan Anqi (born 10 June 1986) is a Chinese retired ice hockey player and coach. She was a member of the Chinese women's national ice hockey team and represented China in the women's ice hockey tournament at the 2010 Winter Olympics. Tan was a coach of the Hong Kong women's national ice hockey team during 2014 to 2017.

References

External links
 
 
 
 
 
 

1986 births
Living people
Chinese women's ice hockey defencemen
Sportspeople from Harbin
Ice hockey players at the 2010 Winter Olympics
Olympic ice hockey players of China
Asian Games medalists in ice hockey
Ice hockey players at the 2007 Asian Winter Games
Medalists at the 2007 Asian Winter Games
Asian Games bronze medalists for China